Amalebra (meaning from the clay of the river Amal) is a hamlet in Cornwall, England, United Kingdom, 3 miles (5 kilometres) south-west of St Ives at Ordnance Survey . According to the Post Office the 2011 census population was included in the civil parish of Towednack.

References

External links

Hamlets in Cornwall